Gene Beery (born 1937) is an American painter and photographer, who has been described as an expressionist, Pop artist, Minimalist, and Conceptualist over his career of fifty-plus years. He is primarily known for his text-based canvases, based on the concept that words and the ideas they provoke can exist as works of art in themselves. Living and working in New York City in the late 1950s and early 1960s, Beery was at the center of the development of both Pop and Conceptual art. Since the 1990s, Beery has also worked as a photographer, intimately documenting his family, friends and life in a snapshot style. He currently lives and works in Sutter Creek, California.

Beery is represented by Derosia in New York, and Parker Gallery in Los Angeles.

Background and education
Beery was born in Racine, Wisconsin in 1937. He attended the University of Wisconsin–Milwaukee and the Layton School of Art, Milwaukee before moving to New York City in the late 1950s where he joined the Arts Student League and became a guard at the Museum of Modern Art.

Work
Working as a guard at the Museum of Modern Art he was befriended by James Rosenquist and Sol LeWitt, his Hester Street neighbor.  In 1961 Beery’s ramshackle hybrid paintings incorporating words and figures were selected for the Museum of Modern Art’s Recent Figure Painting U.S.A. where they caught Max Ernst’s attention. The surrealist was so impressed he awarded Beery $100 on the spot. This windfall was followed by another award from the William and Norma Copley Foundation.  Clearly, Beery’s art had struck a chord within New York’s still extant surrealist community. Marcel Duchamp, who upon meeting the artist for the first time awarded him a cigar, was soon a fan and must have seen in Beery’s art many of the same qualities he found in the art of Louis Eilshemius; paintings that were eccentric, direct, primitive, and archetypically American.

Gene Beery’s conceit, that words and the ideas they convey could alone account for a work of art, attracted the attention of fellow artists. His work was iconoclastic, funny and smart. Seen in art world hindsight it was also ahead of its time, prefiguring the language-based conceptual art of the late 1960s, from John Baldessari to Lawrence Weiner and Robert Barry. While other artists using text and numbers who emerged in the 1960s produced mostly cerebral work lacking evidence of the artist’s hand, Beery seemingly poked fun at the high Conceptualism of the day. He continued to make his uniquely homespun and humorously irreverent canvases, the rawness of their execution a throwback to the Abstract Expressionists. Beery’s free-wheeling humor and graphic flair also align his work with that other then-developing style, Pop Art. Over the years Sol LeWitt remained Beery’s greatest champion; rescuing works from his abandoned New York studio and making these a foundational part of the Sol and Carol LeWitt collection at the Wadsworth Atheneum, as well as underwriting the publication of Beery’s many artist’s books.

After a successful exhibition of his paintings at the Alexander Iolas Gallery in New York in 1963 Beery left town to take residence in San Francisco, and later Petaluma. Several years later the artist moved into the foothills of the Sierra Nevada Mountains outside Sacramento where he continues to live and work.

Solo exhibitions
 2020 : Transmissions from Logoscape Ranch, Bodega, New York
 2019 : New Mythic Visualizations, Cushionworks, San Francisco 
 2019 : Gene Beery, Kunsthalle Fribourg, Fribourg, Switzerland
 2017 : Wall Dancers, Shoot The Lobster, Los Angeles, California
 2016 : Logoscapes / Visual Percussion, Jan Kaps, Cologne, Germany
 2013 : Early Paintings / Later Photographs, Algus Greenspon, New York, NY
 2010 : Algus Greenspon Gallery, New York, NY
 1999 : Mitchell Algus Gallery, New York, NY
 1997 : Mitchell Algus Gallery, New York, NY
 1979 : Matrix 55, Wadsworth Atheneum, Hartford, CT
 1970 : Quay Gallery, San Francisco, CA
 1963 : Alexander Iolas Gallery, New York, NY

Selected group exhibitions
 2020 : Ride Off Like A Cowboy Into Your Sunset, Aguirre, Mexico City, Mexico
 2018 : After Hours in a California Arts Studio, Andrew Kreps, New York, NY
 2016 : The Silo, Garth Greenan Gallery, New York, NY
 2015 : I Dropped the Lemon Tart, Lisa Cooley, New York, NY
 2015 : June, Simone Subal Gallery, New York, NY
 2014 : Keeping a Close Eye on the Wind, (with Josh Abelow), Bodega, New York, NY
 2013 : The Picnic: Adriana Lara & Gene Beery, Algus Greenspon, New York, NY
 2013 : Sol Lewitt as Collector. An Artist and his Artists, Museo d’ Arte Contemporanea Donna Regina, Naples, IT; Centre Pompidou-Metz, Paris, France
 2012 : Materializing "Six Years": Lucy R. Lippard and the Emergence of Conceptual Art, Brooklyn Museum, Brooklyn, NY
 2012 : Context Message, Zach Feuer, New York, NY
 2011 : Summer Salt, The Proposition, New York, NY
 2010 : White Columns Annual, (Curated by Bob Nickas), White Columns, New York, NY
 2008 : Never Work (Curated by Roger White), 191 Henry St, New York, NY
 2006 : Exquisite Corpse (Curated by Bob Nickas and Mitchell Algus), Mitchell Algus Gallery, New York, NY
 1975 : 1975 Biennial Exhibition, Whitney Museum of American Art, New York, NY
 1970 : 955,000 (Curated by Lucy Lippard), Vancouver Art Gallery, Vancouver, Canada
 1969 : 557,087 (Curated by Lucy Lippard), Vancouver Art Gallery, Vancouver, Canada
 1969 : The Spirit of Comics, University of Pennsylvania Institute Contemporary Art (ICA), PA
 1965 : 51st Wisconsin Painters and Sculptors Annual, Milwaukee Art Center, Milwaukee, WI
 1962 : Recent Painting USA: The Figure, Museum of Modern Art, New York, NY

Publications
 Lovay, Balthazar (ed.), Kenneth Goldsmith, Jo Melvin, Gregor Quack. Gene Beery, Fri Art & Mousse Publishing, 2019.

Press
 Ammirati, Domenick, "Gene Beery at Bodega." Artforum, October 2020.
 Rittenbach, Kari, "Gene Beery at Fri Art Kunsthalle." Artforum, September 2019.
 Gerlis, Melanie, "'Gene Beery: Why the cult American artist's time has come." Financial Times, June 13, 2019.
 Irvin, Nick, "'Life: ★★★½." Art in America, November 2016.
 Bossard, Adèle, "'Early Paintings and Recent Photographs' by Gene Beery." Curator's Choice, April 2013.
 Expósito, Frank, "500 WORDS, Gene Beery." Artforum.com, April 2013.
 Abelow, Joshua, "Interview with Gene Beery." Art Blog Art Blog, March 2013. 
 Chou, Kimberly, "Gene Beery." Art in America, December 2010.
 Finch, Charlie, "Play Time." Artnet.com, October 2010.
 Marshall, Piper, "Gene Beery." Artforum.com, October 2010.
 Barliant, Claire, "Goings on About Town; Gene Beery." The New York Times, May 2001.
 Rubinstein, Raphael, "Gene B. Beery." thesilo.raphaelrubinstein.com, July 2010. 
 Johnson, Ken, "Art in Review: Gene Beery." The New York Times, May 2001.
 "Gene Beery." Matrix 55, Wadsworth Antheneum, March 1980.

References

20th-century American painters
American male painters
21st-century American painters
American Expressionist painters
American pop artists
Minimalist artists
American conceptual artists
1937 births
Living people
People from Amador County, California
People from Racine, Wisconsin
University of Wisconsin–Milwaukee alumni
Painters from California
Painters from New York City
Artists from Wisconsin
American contemporary painters
20th-century American male artists